is a Japanese voice actress and singer.

Biography
Satō is affiliated with Aoni Production's Junior Talent. She attended Tokyo Announce Gakuin Performing Arts College. She announced her marriage with fellow voice actor, Takuma Terashima, on July 6, 2017. On December 30, 2021, she reported the birth of her first child with Terashima.

Achievements 
While attending Tokyo Announce Gakuin, Satō was selected to be in the seventh line-up of assistants (Big Bang Grand Prix V) on Miki Tomokazu's Radio Big Bang. As an assistant, she formed the unit Kisty.

Filmography

Anime 

2007
Kamichama Karin as Michirian No. 3
GeGeGe no Kitaro (fifth series) as Female High School Student, Girl and Kijimuna
Shugo Chara! as Wakana, Ramira
Fantastic Detective Labyrinth as Yae Yatomi

2008
GeGeGe no Kitaro (fifth series) as Maid
Jigoku Shoujo Mitsuganae as Mikage Yuzuki
Hyakko as Inori Tsubomiya
Shugo Chara! Doki as Wakana

2009
K-On! as Ritsu Tainaka
Anyamaru Tantei Kiruminzuu as Rimu Mikogami
Asura Cryin' as Aine Shizuma
Asura Cryin' 2 as Aine Shizuma
Dragon Ball Z Kai as Cargo
Hatsukoi Limited as Yuu Enomoto
Yumeiro Patissiere as Kanako Koizumi
A Certain Scientific Railgun as Banri Edasaki, Girl

2010
K-On!! as Ritsu Tainaka
Mayoi Neko Overrun! as Otome Tsuzuki
Seitokai Yakuindomo as Aria Shichijou
Ookami-san as Machiko Himura/Mysterious Beauty
Fairy Tail as Wendy Marvell
Oreimo as Manami Tamura

2011
Ro-Kyu-Bu! as Manaka Nobidome
Sket Dance as Chiaki Takahashi
K-On! the Movie as Ritsu Tainaka

2012
Fairy Tail the Movie: The Phoenix Priestess as Wendy Marvell
Dusk Maiden of Amnesia as Kanoe Yukariko
Hyouka as Eru Chitanda
K as Kukuri Yukizome
Queen's Blade Rebellion as Lyla
Kamisama Hajimemashita as Ami Nekota
Magi: The Labyrinth of Magic as Sahsa

2013
Hyakka Ryōran Samurai Bride as Inshun Hōzōin
Karneval as Erisyuka
A Certain Scientific Railgun S as Edasaki Banri
Ore no Imōto ga Konna ni Kawaii Wake ga Nai. as Manami Tamura
Kiniro Mosaic as Sakura Karasuma
Golden Time as NANA
Free! - Iwatobi Swim Club as Chigusa Hanamura and Nagisa Hazuki (child)

2014
Is the Order a Rabbit? as Chiya Ujimatsu
The Irregular at Magic High School as Mizuki Shibata
Seitokai Yakuindomo* as Aria Shichijou
Fairy Tail  as Wendy Marvell
K: Missing Kings as Kukuri Yukizome
Pretty Guardian Sailor Moon Crystal as Naru Osaka
In Search of the Lost Future as Karin Fukazawa
Denkigai no Honya-san as Tsumorin
Girl Friend Beta as Kokomi Shiina
My Neighbor Seki as Sakurako Gotō

2015
Assassination Classroom as Yukiko Kanzaki
K: Return of Kings as Kukuri Yukizome
Hello!! Kiniro Mosaic as Sakura Karasuma
Seiyu's Life! as Rin's mother
Is the Order a Rabbit?? as Chiya Ujimatsu

2016
Assassination Classroom 2nd Season as Yukiko Kanzaki
Girls Beyond the Wasteland as Uguisu Yūki
Keijo as Mari Murata
Tales of Zestiria the X as Magilou

2017
Fairy Tail the Movie: Dragon Cry as Wendy Marvell
The Irregular at Magic High School: The Movie – The Girl Who Summons the Stars as Mizuki Shibata
Seitokai Yakuindomo: The Movie as Aria Shichijo
Magical Girl Lyrical Nanoha: Reflection as Kyrie Florian

2018
B: The Beginning as Yuna
IDOLiSH7 as Tsumugi Takanashi
Death March to the Parallel World Rhapsody as Nadi
Rascal Does Not Dream of Bunny Girl Senpai as Fumika Nanjō
Fairy Tail (2018) as Wendy Marvell

2019
Endro! as Meigo / Maid Golem
Fruits Basket as Saki Hanajima
Wasteful Days of High School Girls as Lily Someya
Knights of the Zodiac: Saint Seiya as Andromeda Shun
Phantasy Star Online 2: Episode Oracle as Matoi
Demon Slayer: Kimetsu no Yaiba as Tanjiro Kamado (child)
One Piece as Speed
Kandagawa Jet Girls as Syoco

2020
Bofuri as Iz
Fruits Basket: 2nd Season as Saki Hanajima
Is the Order a Rabbit? BLOOM as Chiya Ujimatsu
Wandering Witch: The Journey of Elaina as Nino

2021
Seitokai Yakuindomo: The Movie 2 as Aria Shichijo
B: The Beginning Succession as Yuna
The Dungeon of Black Company as Belza
Non Non Biyori Nonstop as Shiori's mother

2022
Princess Connect! Re:Dive Season 2 as Ninon
Play It Cool, Guys as Asami Futami

2023
Bofuri 2nd Season as Iz

Video games 

2009
Tales of the World: Radiant Mythology 2 as Descender
Yakuza 3 additional voices

2010
God Eater as Gina Dickinson, Female voice 01
God Eater Pachi-slot as Aki Tamashiro(Female Protagonist), Gina Dickinson
Elsword as Ara Haan
Tales of Phantasia: Narikiri Dungeon X as Wonder Chef
K-On! Hōkago Live!! as Ritsu Tainaka
Koumajou Densetsu II: Stranger's Requiem (紅魔城伝説II 妖幻の鎮魂歌) as Hong Meiling

2011
Tales of the World: Radiant Mythology 3 as Lazaris
Otomedius Excellent as Gesshi Hanafuuma, Ryukotsuki, Gradian Operator
Magical Girl Lyrical Nanoha A's Portable: The Gears of Destiny as Kyrie Florian

2012
Phantasy Star Online 2 as Matoi
Digimon World Re:Digitize as Akiho Rindou
New Class of Heroes: Chrono Academy as Mauriat
Rune Factory 4 as Amber
Tales of Xillia 2 as Nova

2013
The Legend of Heroes: Trails of Cold Steel as Alfin Reise Arnor
God Eater 2 as Gina Dickinson

2014
Granblue Fantasy as Carren
Samurai Warriors 4 as Lady Hayakawa
Super Smash Bros. 4 as female Corrin (DLC)
The Legend of Heroes: Trails of Cold Steel II as Alfin Reise Arnor

2015
God Eater 2: Rage Burst as Gina Dickinson
Fire Emblem Fates as female Corrin and female Kana
Fate/Grand Order as Caster of Midrash/Queen of Sheba

2016
Girls Beyond the Wasteland as Uguisu Yūki
Tales of Berseria as Magilou
Fushigi no Gensokyo TOD -Reloaded- as Reimu Hakurei

2017
Fire Emblem Heroes as female Corrin, female Kanna and Naga
Touhou Genso Wanderer as Reimu Hakurei
Azur Lane as KMS Roon, IJN Hakuryuu
Fire Emblem Warriors as female Corrin
The Legend of Heroes: Trails of Cold Steel III as Alfin Reise Arnor

2018
Princess Connect! Re:Dive as Ninon
Super Robot Wars X as Amari Aquamarine
Girls' Frontline as JS05 and HK23
Arena of Valor as Diao Chan
The Legend of Heroes: Trails of Cold Steel IV as Alfin Reise Arnor
Super Smash Bros. Ultimate as female Corrin

2019
Pokémon Masters EX as Caitlin
Kemono Friends 3 as Cerberus
Duel Masters PLAY'S as Elena, Guardian of Light

2020
Arknights as Dorothy
Kandagawa Jet Girls as Syoco
The Legend of Heroes: Trails into Reverie as Alfin Reise Arnor
Punishing: Gray Raven as Selena

2021
Gate of Nightmares as Uretan

2022
Food Girls 2: Civil War as Coco
Counter:Side as Nanahara Chinatsu
Koumajou Remilia: Scarlet Symphony as Hong Meiling
Goddess of Victory: Nikke as N102 and Anne

2023
Fire Emblem Engage as Female Corrin

Radio 
Kisutī no kisutī taimu (kistyのkisty time) on internet radio station BBQR
Tomokazu Miki no rajio bigguban (智一・美樹のラジオビッグバン)（QR, November 2005 til September 2006
Tanahashi Mai to Satō Satomi no ranchitaimu myūjikku (棚橋麻衣と佐藤聡美のランチタイムミュージック), September to December 2007
Mai to Shugā no masshu rūmu (麻衣としゅがぁのまっしゅ☆Room), 4-5pm Saturdays, January to March 2008
Rajio Dotto Ai; Satō Satomi no shugaa potto (ラジオどっとあい　佐藤聡美のしゅがぁぽっと), October 9, 2009 till January 1, 2010
Rajio☆Satomi Hakkenden! (ラジオ☆聡美はっけん伝！), 9-10pm Fridays, April 8, 2011 till April 8, 2014

Drama CD 
Gattsu Batorā Jī (ガッツバトラーG) as Girl
Nusunde Ririsu (盗んでリ・リ・ス) as Maid
Renai Idenshi XX (恋愛遺伝子XX) as Mizuki

Dubbing 
Ender's Game as Petra Arkanian (Hailee Steinfeld)

Others
Voiceroid+ as Zunko Tohoku
Vocaloid as Zunko Tohoku's voice provider

Singles and albums
"Koibito wa tententen" (恋人は......) with Kisty

As the voice actor for Ritsu Tainaka in K-On!, she participated in four singles and one album.
 "Cagayake! Girls" ranked No. 2 on Japanese Oricon singles charts.
 "Don't say 'lazy'" ranked No. 3 on Oricon singles charts, and was awarded Animation Kobe's "Best Song" award.
 "Light and Fluffy Time" ("ふわふわ時間") ranked No. 3 on Oricon singles charts.
 "Ritsu Tainaka" ("田井中律") image song CD of the eponymous character, ranked No. 5 on Oricon singles charts.
 Hōkago Teatime (放課後ティータイム) ranked No. 1 on Oricon albums charts.

References

External links 
  
  

 Satomi Satō at Starchild's profile 
 

1986 births
Living people
Anime singers
Aoni Production voice actors
Japanese video game actresses
Japanese voice actresses
Vocaloid voice providers
Voice actresses from Sendai
21st-century Japanese women singers
21st-century Japanese singers